Cyperus reduncus is a species of sedge that is native to tropical parts of Africa.

See also 
 List of Cyperus species

References 

reduncus
Plants described in 1868
Flora of Benin
Flora of Burkina Faso
Flora of the Central African Republic
Flora of Chad
Flora of Ethiopia
Flora of the Democratic Republic of the Congo
Flora of the Republic of the Congo
Flora of the Gambia
Flora of Ghana
Flora of Guinea
Flora of Ivory Coast
Flora of Mali
Flora of Nigeria
Flora of Senegal
Flora of Sudan
Flora of Tanzania
Flora of Togo
Flora of Uganda
Flora of Zambia
Taxa named by Johann Otto Boeckeler